Project Runway Season 9 is the ninth season of the television show Project Runway.  The season began airing on July 28, 2011 and features 20 designers who hope to become "the next great American designer."

Returning as judges were supermodel Heidi Klum; fashion designer Michael Kors; and Marie Claire fashion director, Nina Garcia. Tim Gunn returned as the workroom mentor.

In 2012, Laura Kathleen Planck, Joshua McKinley, and Anthony Ryan Auld competed in the second season of Project Runway All Stars. Laura Kathleen Planck placed 6th, Joshua McKinley placed 4th, and Anthony Ryan Auld won the competition.

In 2013, Viktor Luna competed in the third season of All Stars. He placed 5th.

In 2018, Kimberly Goldson and Joshua McKinley (in his second All Stars appearance) competed in the sixth season of All Stars, placing 9th and 7th respectively.

Anthony Ryan Auld, alongside Anya Ayoung-Chee, competed in the seventh season against worldwide winners. Anya Ayoung-Chee placed 10th while Anthony Ryan Auld placed 5th.

Contestants

Designers

In the first episode, 4 designers were eliminated and 16 continued to participate in the show.

Models

 The model won Project Runway Season 9.
 The model wore the winning design that challenge.
 The model wore the losing design that challenge.
 The model was eliminated.

: The models were not used in Episodes 3, 8 & 9
Designer legend
Anya Ayoung-Chee: AC
Joshua McKinley: JM
Viktor Luna: VL
Kimberly Goldson: KG
Laura Kathleen: LK
Bert Keeter: BK
Anthony Ryan Auld: AA 
Olivier Green: OG 
Bryce Black: BB 
Becky Ross: BR
Joshua Christensen: JC
Danielle Everine: DE
Cecilia Motwani: CM
Julie Tierney: JT
Fallene Wells: FW
Rafael Cox: RC

Elimination Table

: In episode 1, Amanda, David, Gunnar, and Serena were the 4 designers who were eliminated before the final 16 were officially participants of the show.
: After Cecilia withdrew from the competition in episode 5, Olivier and Viktor were allowed to pick any previously eliminated contestant to come back into the competition to join their team. They chose Joshua C.
: In episode 5, although the judges categorized all the clothes into ones they liked and didn't like, their deliberation revealed the ones they liked the most (Joshua M., Olivier, Viktor) and the ones they liked the least (Anthony, Bryce, Danielle). In addition, although Joshua M. was chosen as a winner, the actual winning design from his team was the dress designed and sewn by Anya and Becky, respectively.
: In episode 10, the prize was that the winning designer's garment would be produced and sold on Piperlime.  After Anya was declared the winner, it was announced that Bert's garment will also be produced and sold on the site.
: All four contestants went on to compete at Fashion Week, for the first time since season 3.

 The designer won the Project Runway Season 9.
 The designer won the challenge.
 The designer was in the top two, or the first announced into the top 3, but did not win. 
 The designer had one of the highest scores for that challenge, but did not win.
 The designer had one of the lowest scores for that challenge, but was not eliminated.
 The designer was in the bottom two, but was not eliminated.
 The designer lost and was out of the competition.
 The designer was not in the Top 16 and was out of the competition.
 The designer withdrew from the competition.

Episodes

Episode 1: Come As You Are
Original Airdate: July 28, 2011

As the season begins and the designers arrive in New York, they are informed that they are not yet part of season 9. For the final stage of their casting session, the 20 designers must go in front of Heidi, Michael, Nina and Tim to make a case as to why they deserve one of the 16 coveted spots this season.

ELIMINATED: Amanda, David, Gunnar & Serena

The next day, the 16 remaining designers are awoken by Tim in the early morning hours and given their first challenge: transform the pajamas they are wearing and one bed sheet into an outfit of their choice. Dyes, trim, and closures are provided.
Guest Judge: Christina Ricci

WINNER: Bert
ELIMINATED: Rafael

Amanda has returned for season 14.
Gunnar has returned for season 10.

Episode 2: My Pet Project
Original Airdate: August 4, 2011

The designers must create an outfit using only materials found in a pet supply store.

Guest Judge:  Stacey Bendet 

WINNER: Olivier
ELIMINATED: Joshua C.

Episode 3: Go Big or Go Home
Original Airdate: August 11, 2011

The designers work on a challenge revolving around a theme called "Larger than Life". In teams of two with a budget of $500 and one day to work, they create outfits for professional stilt walkers. The runway show is at Battery Park, making it the first runway show to be held outside.

Pairs: Anthony Ryan & Laura, Bryce & Fallene, Danielle & Cecilia, Joshua M. & Julie, Viktor & Bert, Anya & Olivier, and Kimberly & Becky

Guest Judge: Kim Kardashian

WINNER: Laura
ELIMINATED: Fallene

Episode 4: All About Nina
Original Airdate: August 18, 2011

The designers create a look for judge Nina Garcia that should be wearable by Garcia during work and for an industry event at night. The winning design will be featured in a Marie Claire editorial and on a billboard atop a New York City taxicab.

Guest Judge: Kerry Washington, Joanna Coles (Editor in Chief of Marie Claire)
WINNER: Kimberly
ELIMINATED: Julie

Episode 5: Off the Track
Original Airdate: August 25, 2011

The designers meet at the New Balance Track and Field Center in New York City and are challenged to create apparel to wear with a new Heidi Klum for New Balance lifestyle sneaker from Klum's collection. The designers work in teams of three, with team leaders chosen by holding a foot race at the Track and Field Center. The winning looks will be sold as part of Klum's collection exclusively on Amazon.com.

Guest Judge: Erin Wasson

WINNERS: Joshua M. and Viktor
WITHDREW: Cecilia
ELIMINATED: Danielle
Cecilia withdrew from the competition and was replaced by Josh C.

Episode 6: The Art of the Matter
Original Airdate: September 1, 2011

The designers each work together with an art student to create a painting, and then must design an avant-garde look that reflects their art work. They have a budget of $300 and two days to complete their look.

Guest Judge: Kenneth Cole, Zanna Roberts Rassi (in for Nina Garcia)

WINNER: Anthony Ryan
ELIMINATED: Joshua C.

Episode 7: Can't We Just All Get Along?
Original Airdate: September 8, 2011

The designers plug into computer technology to help create signature fabric designs in a challenge that forces them into working in two teams of five. Wielding video cameras, they also venture out into the city to capture the stories behind their inspirations.

Guest Judge: Rachel Roy, Rose Byrne

WINNER: Anya
ELIMINATED: Becky

Episode 8: What Women Want
Original Airdate: September 15, 2011

The contestants are introduced to nine men on the runway and, in a seamless twist, discover they must design for the men's significant others. Actress Malin Akerman is the guest judge.

Guest Judge: Malin Akerman

WINNER: Joshua M.
ELIMINATED: Bryce

Episode 9: Image is Everything
Original Airdate: September 22, 2011

The outfitters are treated to a special performance from their new client, the up-and-coming band The Sheepdogs. Broken into two teams of four, the designers are charged with creating a look that will establish them as image-makers.

Guest Judge: Adam Lambert

WINNER: Viktor
ELIMINATED: Olivier

Episode 10: Sew 70s
Original Airdate: September 29, 2011

The remaining designers do the time warp when fashions from the 1970s inspire their creations.

Guest Judge: Olivia Palermo

WINNER: Anya
ELIMINATED: Anthony Ryan

Episode 11: This is for the Birds
Original Airdate: October 6, 2011

Birds serve as the inspiration for the looks in this challenge. Designers are paired up, with each pair assigned a bird. They then learn that they are not competing together, but rather head-to-head. 
Kimberly and Viktor design head-to-head with a cockatoo as their inspiration, Anya and Laura with a raven, and Bert and Joshua with an Amazon parrot.

Guest Judge: Francisco Costa

WINNER: Anya
ELIMINATED: Bert

Episode 12: The Finale Challenge
Original Airdate: October 13, 2011

The remaining designers had to create 3 looks from inspirations on Governor's Island. They were assisted by the five most recently eliminated contestants.

Guest Judge:  Zoe Saldana

ADVANCED: Anya,  Viktor, Joshua M., Kimberly
ELIMINATED: Laura

Episode 13: The Finale, Part 1
Original Airdate: October 20, 2011

The final four designers are critiqued on their collections and compete, for the last time, to show at Fashion Week. In a shock elimination, it is revealed that all of the four designers will be advancing to Fashion Week instead of the usual three.

Guest Judge: None

ADVANCED TO FASHION WEEK: Joshua M., Viktor, Kimberly, Anya

Episode 14: The Finale, Part 2
Original Airdate: October 27, 2011

The four finalists work the last part of preparation for Fashion Week, including model casting and hair and makeup counseling. Each shows their collection pieces before the winner of Project Runway Season 9 is announced.

Guest Judge: L'Wren Scott
WINNER: Anya
ELIMINATED: Joshua M., Viktor, Kimberly

Trivia

 Anya Ayoung-Chee won the Miss Trinidad and Tobago Universe in 2008 and represented her country in the Miss Universe pageant the same year but she failed to place in the Top 15 semifinalists.

References

External links 

Season 09
2011 American television seasons
2011 in fashion